
Gmina Rędziny is a rural gmina (administrative district) in Częstochowa County, Silesian Voivodeship, in southern Poland.

Villages
Gmina Rędziny contains the villages and settlements of Konin, Kościelec, Madalin, Marianka Rędzińska, Rędziny and Rudniki.

Neighbouring gminas
Gmina Rędziny is bordered by the city of Częstochowa and by the gminas of Kłomnice, Mstów and Mykanów.

References

Redziny
Częstochowa County